Larestan County is in Fars province, Iran. The capital of the county is the city of Lar. At the 2006 census, the county's population was 223,235 in 49,571 households. The following census in 2011 counted 226,879 people in 54,686 households, by which time Gerash District had been separated from the county to form Gerash County. At the 2016 census, the county's population was 213,920 in 60,410 households. Evaz District was separated from the county in 2018 to form Evaz County. Juyom District was separated from Larestan County on 25 March 2021 to form Juyom County.

Administrative divisions

The population history and structural changes of Larestan County's administrative divisions over three consecutive censuses are shown in the following table. The latest census shows six districts, 13 rural districts, and eight cities.

The historical region of Larestan and Lamerd consists of several counties in Fars province (Larestan County, Khonj County, Gerash County and Lamerd County) and Bastak County in Hormozgan province.

Larestani people speak the Larestani language. Larestani people are of Persian descent, the majority of Larestani people are Sunnis. Larestani people call themselves "Khodmooni".

Under medieval age, Laristan was ruled by the local dynasty of Miladi, until it was removed by a Safavid invasion in 1610. In the thirteenth century, Larestan briefly became a center of trade and commerce in southern Persia. Larestan was nearly always an obscure region, never becoming involved in the politics and conflicts of mainstream Persia.

See also 
Bastak and Bastak County
Evaz and Evaz County
Gerash County
Hola (ethnic group)
Khonj County
Lamerd County
Larestani people

References

External links

Gerash.com
Khodmooni Forum Connecting Khodmoonis All Over the World

 

Counties of Fars Province